Dark Live Magick is the first and so far, only live album by Runemagick released in 2001. It is recorded live during a small private party gig in Ljungskile. It is released on vinyl as a limited run of 300 hand-numbered copies.

Track listing
 "Celebration of Death (intro)" - 1:18
 "Hymn of Darkness" - 0:48
 "Dark Necroshadows" - 3:35
 "Death Collector" - 3:51
 "Return of the Reaper" - 4:41
 "Dreamvoid Serpent" - 4:17
 "Reborn in Necromancy" - 5:27
 "Curse of the Dark Rune" - 3:52
 "Dethrone the Flesh" - 5:09
 "When Death Is the Key" - 5:13
 "Lord of the Grave" - 5:49
 "Hail Death" - 4:37

Runemagick albums
2001 live albums